Waterbed Hev is the first solo album and sixth album overall by rapper Heavy D.  The album was released on April 22, 1997 for Uptown Records and was produced by Heavy D, DJ Battle Cat and Tony Dofat.  This marked Heavy D's first album without "The Boyz", DJ Eddie F and G-Wiz.  Waterbed Hev made it to #9 on the Billboard 200 and #3 on the Top R&B/Hip-Hop Albums chart, going gold in the process.  Four singles were released, "Waterbed Hev", "I'll Do Anything", "Keep It Coming" (US #23) and "Big Daddy" (US #18).  Guests on the album include Lost Boyz, Method Man, Soul for Real and Tha Dogg Pound.

Track listing
"Big Daddy" - 4:09 
"Keep It Comin'" - 4:26 
"You Can Get It" (feat. Lost Boyz, Method Man & Soul for Real) - 4:41 
"Waterbed Hev" - 4:28 
"Shake It" - 4:11 
"I'll Do Anything" - 3:52 
"Don't Be Afraid" (feat. Big Bub) - 4:14 
"Justa' Interlude" - 1:06 
"Can You Handle It" (feat. Tha Dogg Pound & McGruff) - 4:15 
"Wanna Be a Player" - 2:41 
"Get Fresh Hev" - 3:02 
"Big Daddy" (Remix) (feat. McGruff) - 3:31

Samples
"Big Daddy (Remix)"
"Back to Life" by Soul II Soul
"Don't Be Afraid"
"Gimme What You Got" by Le Pamplemousse
"I'll Do Anything"
"I Can't Go for That (No Can Do)" by Hall & Oates
"Keep It Coming"
"Yearning for Your Love" by The Gap Band
"Wanna Be a Player"
"I Think I Love You" by The Partridge Family
"Waterbed Hev"
"Givin' It Up Is Givin' Up" by Patrice Rushen
"You Can Get It"
"Risin' to the Top" by Keni Burke
"Go Stetsa I" by Stetsasonic

Certifications

References

Heavy D albums
1997 debut albums
Universal Records albums